Thomas J. Strauss, Pharm.D. is the President and CEO of Summa Health System, in Ohio.

Prior to joining Summa Health System in 1999, Strauss was the president of Meridia Health Services in Cleveland (which later merged with Cleveland Clinic Health System). For ten years, Strauss held a number of leadership positions with Meridia, including the leadership for the system, eight service lines, president of the eastern region, president of Meridia South Pointe Hospital, president of Meridia Suburban Hospital and president of Meridia Institute/Meridia Health Ventures.

Strauss also has experience in private industry and held several positions with Baxter Health Corporation (formerly American Hospital Supply Corporation), prior to his tenure at Meridia. The positions he held at Baxter included: vice president of Caremark Homecare, Inc.; zone director for Travacare Home Therapy; area operations manager for American Abbey Homecare and branch manager of American ContinueCare. A pharmacist by trade, Strauss was the assistant director of patient care modules at Allegheny General Hospital prior to joining Baxter in 1983.

Earning his doctor of pharmacy degree from Duquesne University in 1978, Strauss then completed his residency in pharmacology at Mercy Hospital.

Strauss is a member of the Akron Regional Hospital Association, the Greater Akron Chamber, the Cleveland Health Network, the United Way of Summit County, Akron Tomorrow, and the Ohio Hospital Association's CEO Committee on Advocacy and Policy.

He and his wife, Susan and have three sons.

External links 
http://www.summahealth.org
https://web.archive.org/web/20070106114433/http://www.summahospitalsfoundation.org/
http://www.summahealthnetwork.org

Duquesne University alumni
Living people
Year of birth missing (living people)